Computer-assisted structure elucidation (or CASE) is the technique of using software to generate all possible molecular structures that are consistent with a particular set of spectroscopic data.
The subject has been often reviewed. Available CASE software include LSD, SENECA, COCON, CMC-se, and Structure Elucidator.

See also
Computational chemistry
Nuclear magnetic resonance spectroscopy

References

Computational chemistry